Knorr Taste Quest is a Unilever Nigeria-sponsored TV reality show that started airing in 2013. The show was created to reinforce Knorr's culinary expertise and to bring to life the brand's love for flavor. It is designed for people to showcase their culinary skills, as well as bring to the homes of consumers an exciting and educational cooking show in Nigeria. During the show, the brand's panel of expert judges give various tasks to the contestants to test their culinary prowess and also their creativity.

Two well-known Nigerian celebrity chefs, Dr Robert and Chef Fregz, have been the judges from the start of the show to Season 4. In the competition, the judges select the best 12 contestants to compete for 13 weeks, with one of them emerging as the winner and ultimately crowned as Nigeria's culinary best.

Format 
At the start of each season, there is a ‘call to entry’ into the competition and afterwards an audition process where qualified candidates are selected to enter into the final competition which can involve delivering different tasks as allocated by the judges. The grand finale usually involves 3 top contestants battling it out for the chance to emerge the winner.

The 5th season is broadcast on;

Saturday: NTA- 6-7PM, AIT-7-8PM
Sunday: DSTV/African Magic Family- 7-8PM, gotv/ African Magic Family- 7-8PM

Season 1

Contestants

References 

 Knorr Taste Quest Season III Kicks Off in Lagos The Guardian. Retrieved 25 April 2015
 Lalu Surdiham Emerges as Knorr Taste Quest’s Season 1 Winner Bella Naija. Retrieved 26 April 2015
 Four emerge best in Knorr Taste Quest Season 3 The Nation . Retrieved October 2, 2015
 Indonesian wins Knorr Taste Quest reality TV show Vanguard Retrieved 13 April 2013 
 Unilever Commences Knorr Taste Quest Season IV Flatimes . Retrieved 4 May 2016

External links
 Website

Nigerian reality television series
2010s Nigerian television series
2013 Nigerian television series debuts
Food reality television series
Nigerian Television Authority original programming
Africa Independent Television original programming